The European Masters Athletics Championships Non Stadia is a biennial international athletics competition for masters athletes aged 35 and over, organised by European Masters Athletics. Formerly known as the European Veterans Non-Stadia Championships, it was first held in 1989. It typically takes place over two or three days in April or May.

The competition provides European championship competitions for masters athletes in non-track and field athletics events. This includes road running events in the 10K run and half marathon, relay cross country running events, and racewalking events in the 10 kilometres race walk, 20 kilometres race walk (women only), and 30 kilometres race walk (men only). Men's and women's marathon championships were contested in 1989 and men's and women's 25K run events were held in 1991.

Editions

References

 
Masters athletics (track and field) competitions
Recurring sporting events established in 1989
Biennial athletics competitions
Athletics competitions in Europe
1989 establishments in Europe